T3 Transit is a Canadian public transport company operating buses throughout the capital region of Prince Edward Island, including Charlottetown and the towns of Cornwall and Stratford.

History

Founded in 2005 as Charlottetown Transit, the 150th anniversary year of the city's incorporation. It is funded by the municipal and federal levels of government and provides service throughout the city's neighbourhoods. The province of Prince Edward Island does not provide transit subsidies toward the service. The last attempt at public transit was in the form of Charlottetown Urban Transit Systems Limited from late 1979 to 1981.

The name "Charlottetown Transit" was merely a marketing name and not a legally incorporated company. All buses are owned by the City of Charlottetown but are operated under contract by privately owned Trius Tours Limited.

In February, 2012, Charlottetown Transit changed its name to T3 Transit. The new brand offers services to Charlottetown, Cornwall, and Stratford, as well as a Summerside and County Line Express.

Most buses are designed to have the appearance of a tram or streetcar and were constructed by Dupont Industries (Thomas MVP EF Champlain 1608 LF and HF), as well as MCI Classic buses). The trolley buses are smaller than conventional transit bus designs and must be able to navigate the narrower streets and intersections in the city's downtown core.

In 2018, T3 Transit ran a demonstration with an electric bus, an American made New Flyer Xcelsior CHARGE. The company is considering upgrading its fleet in the future to electric buses. If government funding goes through, the buses will be delivered 2020 or 2021.

Routes
Current operations have 10 bus routes running from Monday to Friday with reduced routes on Saturday as follows:

Greater Charlottetown
 University Avenue
 Charlottetown East to West
 Charlottetown West to East
 Airport and Winsloe Collector
 Cornwall
 Stratford
 QEH and East Collector
 Community Bus Route 5

Summerside
 County Line - Serving points between Summerside and Charlottetown
 Summerside - Serving the city of Summerside

References

External links
 Official website

Bus transport in Prince Edward Island
Canadian companies established in 2005
Transport in Charlottetown
Transit agencies in Prince Edward Island
Paratransit services in Canada
2005 establishments in Prince Edward Island